Lawrence Donald "Bobby" Locke (March 3, 1934 – June 4, 2020) was an American professional baseball right-handed pitcher, who played in Major League Baseball (MLB) in all or parts of nine seasons (–; –) for the Cleveland Indians, St. Louis Cardinals, Philadelphia Phillies, Cincinnati Reds and California Angels.

Major League career

Cleveland Indians
Locke made his Indians' debut in 1959 against the Boston Red Sox. He was the starting pitcher for the Indians, and his first pitch was to Don Buddin. After recording two outs, the first hit he gave up was to Vic Wertz, which resulted in Gene Stephens scoring the first run against Locke. In his debut he pitched for 5 2/3 innings and gave up five runs, but still managed to walk away with the no-decision. However, his main contribution to his debut was hitting a home run off Frank Sullivan, which resulted in three runs being scored. This was to be the only home run of his career.

In 1959 overall, he posted a 3.13 ERA in 24 games, seven of them started. He struck out 40 batters, walked 41 and posted a record of 3–2.

In 1960, Locke posted a 3–5 record, with an ERA of 3.37. He started 11 of the 32 games he appeared in and struck out 53 batters in 123 innings. He also completed the only two games of his career that year.

In 1961 he posted a 4.53 ERA while giving up 112 hits in 95.1 innings. He walked 40 batters, struck out 37 and posted a 4–4 record.

Career after the Indians
After the 1961 season, Locke was traded to the Chicago Cubs for Jerry Kindall.

He moved to the St. Louis Cardinals for the 1962 season but after only playing one game with them, he moved to the Philadelphia Phillies.

Between 1962 and 1964, Locke appeared in 22 games for the Phillies, with a record of one win and no losses.

Totals
Overall, Locke had a 16–15 record in 165 games. In 416.2 innings pitched, he walked 165 batters (bases on balls) and struck out 194 while allowing 432 hits. As a batter he made 25 hits in 98 at-bats for a .255 career batting average with one home run and 12 RBI. As a fielder, he achieved a .968 fielding percentage.

References

External links

Bobby Locke at SABR (Baseball BioProject)
Bobby Locke at Baseball Almanac
Bobby Locke  at Baseball Gauge

1934 births
2020 deaths
Arkansas Travelers players
Baseball players from Pennsylvania
Buffalo Bisons (minor league) players
California Angels players
Cincinnati Reds players
Cleveland Indians players
Daytona Beach Islanders players
Hawaii Islanders players
Indianapolis Indians players
Keokuk Kernels players
Major League Baseball pitchers
People from Fayette County, Pennsylvania
Philadelphia Phillies players
Reading Indians players
St. Louis Cardinals players
San Diego Padres (minor league) players
Seattle Angels players
Sherbrooke Indians players
Syracuse Chiefs players
Tulsa Oilers (baseball) players